The 1940 All-SEC football team consists of American football players selected to the All-Southeastern Conference (SEC) chosen by various selectors for the 1940 college football season. Tennessee won the conference.

All-SEC selections

Ends
Buddy Elrod, Miss. St. (AP-1, INS, UP)
Holt Rast, Alabama (AP-1, INS, UP)
Ed Cifers, Tennessee (AP-2)
Bob Ison, Georgia Tech (AP-2)
Fergie Ferguson, Florida (AP-3)
Harold Newman, Alabama (AP-3)

Tackles
Abe Shires, Tennessee (AP-1, INS, UP)
Charles Dufour, Tulane (AP-2, INS)
John Tripson, Miss. St. (AP-2, UP)
Fred Davis, Alabama (AP-1)
John Eibner, Kentucky (AP-3)
John Barrett, LSU (AP-3)

Guards
Bob Suffridge, Tennessee (College Football Hall of Fame) (AP-1, INS, UP)
John W. Goree, LSU (AP-3, INS, UP)
Hunter Corhern, Miss. St. (AP-1)
Ed Molinski, Tennessee (College Football Hall of Fame) (AP-2)
Edward Hickerson, Alabama (AP-2)
Julius Battista, Florida (AP-3)

Centers
Bob Gude, Vanderbilt (AP-1, INS, UP)
Norbert Ackermann, Tennessee (AP-2)

Backfield
Bob Foxx, Tennessee (AP-1, INS, UP)
Harvey Johnson, Miss. St. (AP-2, INS, UP)
John Hovious, Ole Miss (AP-1, INS)
Jimmy Nelson, Alabama (AP-1, INS)
James Thibaut, Tulane (AP-2, UP)
Neal McGowen, Auburn (AP-1)
Frank Sinkwich, Georgia (College Football Hall of Fame)   (UP)
John Butler, Tennessee (AP-2)
Merle Hapes, Ole Miss (AP-2)
Charles Ishmael, Kentucky (AP-3)
John Bosch, Georgia Tech (AP-3)
Rufus Deal, Auburn (AP-3)
William Jefferson, Miss St. (AP-3)

Key

AP = compiled by the Associated Press, chosen by the conference coaches.

INS = International News Service.

UP = United Press
Bold = Consensus first-team selection

See also
1940 College Football All-America Team

References

All-SEC
All-SEC football teams